"Thousand Miles" is the second single from the Dutch pop punk band Destine from their second studio album. The song was released on September 30, 2011 and received significant airplay. It's their only single to date not to chart on the Netherlands Top 40 charts. As of September 28 every one who "tweeded" the band through Twitter received the single for free.

A music video directed by the bands keyboard player Laurens Troost was released on September 30, 2011.

Track listing

iTunes single

References

External links
 Video

2011 singles
2011 songs
Songs written by Anders Bagge
Sony Music singles